Darya Alekseyevna Melnikova is a Russian actress in theater, film and television.

Biography
Darya Melnikova was born in Omsk, Russia. 
She learned to play the piano at a music school and was involved in ballet.

In 2009 from Melnikova was admitted to the M.S. Schepkin Higher Theatre School (Institute).

Since 2013, the actress has been with the Moscow Yermolova Theatre.

Career
In 2006 Melnikova debuted. She played the main role in the film Cinderella 4×4. Everything starts with desire. It was released in 2008. Her performance in this film earned her two nominations. The aspiring actress played 14-year-old Cinderella — an ordinary teen who is a little bit strange, dreamy and always gets into strange and unusual situations. For this role Melnikova was awarded the prize for the Best Female child role at the XVII Open Film Festival of CIS countries "Kinoshock - 2008" and Best Actress in a children’s movie at XII All-Russian Festival of Visual Arts.

But the real fame came to the actress in 2007. She played the role of Eugenia "Zhenya" Vasnetsova, the most athletic of the daughters, in the TV series Daddy's Daughters.

In 2009, Darya starred in the film Ash Waltz and in two series: The rules of theft and That's Life. In the same year she entered Shchukin Theater School in Moscow.

Melnikova has become the face of L’Oréal. The actress starred in a L’Oréal Paris Pure Zone commercial.

Darya enjoys photography and she is going to release the book of her stories and photos titled Pictures to attract attention.

Personal life
Melnikova had a son on October 26, 2015 with her husband, Artur Smolyaninov. On June 6, 2021, the actress announced her divorce from Artur Smolyaninov.

Filmography

References

External links
 

1992 births
Living people
Actors from Omsk
Russian child actresses
Russian television actresses
Russian film actresses
Russian stage actresses
21st-century Russian actresses
Russian voice actresses